Anoop Manoj Desai (born December 20, 1986) is an American singer-songwriter and actor best known for his time as a contestant on the eighth season of American Idol. Desai was the first ever 13th finalist on American Idol and was the second Indian American to advance to the final stages of the show.

Biography

Early life
Desai, an only child, was born in Cary, North Carolina. His family moved to nearby Chapel Hill in 1998. He went to Fuller GT Magnet Elementary School in Raleigh, North Carolina. His parents both work in North Carolina’s Research Triangle. Desai’s father, Manoj Desai, graduated from IIT Kanpur and came to the US in 1977, and his mother, Nalini Desai, studied in a college program in Navsari, Gujarat and earned her doctorate in South Africa, and works in the bio-tech field. He is fluent in Gujarati.

In the 1990s, Desai appeared on the WRAL-TV (NC Triangle) television children's show, CentralXpress.com, and played the character "Raj". The show won multiple awards, including seven regional Emmys, two national Iris awards, and a national Gabriel Award.

Desai attended Carnage Middle School and Phillips Middle School, then later went on to attend East Chapel Hill High School, graduating in 2004. During his time at East Chapel Hill High School, he was a member of the all-male a cappella group, the Chiefs of Staff. He was awarded a four-year academic merit scholarship to attend the University of North Carolina at Chapel Hill and was the Haywood W. Hinkle Carolina scholar from 2004 to 2008.

After being accepted and planning to attend college at the University of North Carolina at Chapel Hill, Desai auditioned for and was accepted as a member of the UNC Clef Hangers, a long-standing male a cappella group founded in 1977. He was accepted in the group as a senior in high school with the understanding that he would begin attending the university in the fall of 2004. Desai served as the group's music director during his junior year and as the group's president his senior year. Desai's performance as a soloist on the song “She Has No Time” was recognized with the BOCA 2007 (Best of College A Cappella).

Desai graduated from UNC in 2008 with a Bachelor of Arts degree, with a double major of political science and American Studies. He was awarded the 2008 Peter C. Baxter Memorial Prize in American Studies, as one who exemplified "intellectual excellence, personal warmth and creativity. In 2018, He later married his Wife, Anna Desai, making Brighton Scott, and Avery Black his nephew and  niece. "

American Idol

Overview
Desai rose to national fame with his participation in the eighth season of American Idol. Motivated by the death of his friend Eve Carson, Desai auditioned for American Idol on August 8, 2008, in Kansas City, Missouri, and was selected as a semifinalist following his "Hollywood Week" performances., Although he was not one of the three finalists chosen out of his semifinal performance group, he returned as a "Wild Card." The judges saved Desai for last on Wild Card night and after announcing that Matt Giraud had made the Top 12, Simon Cowell then revealed the twist of Season 8: that Desai would also move onto the finals, leading to the first ever Top 13 in Idol history.

Desai's first finals performance of Michael Jackson's "Beat It" was panned by the judges, with Simon Cowell saying that it was "very lightweight" and that he regretted choosing Desai for the Top 13. But Desai won the judges over again the next week, when he sang Willie Nelson's classic country ballad "Always On My Mind" for "Grand Ole Opry Week." Even Cowell was impressed, enough to retract his remarks about Desai not deserving to be in the Top 13. Desai's rendition of Cyndi Lauper's "True Colors" three weeks later, which also garnered praise from the judges, prompted Cowell to compare the contestant to a "yo-yo", going back and forth between good and weak performances.

Nonetheless, Desai landed in the Bottom Two that week, just as he had the previous week. He finished in the Bottom Three during Top 7 week, when Matt Giraud was saved from elimination by the judges. This meant the next week would be a double elimination, wherein Desai ended up being voted off along with Lil Rounds.

Celebrities such as Ellen DeGeneres and Keith Urban said they favored Desai to win.

Desai returned for the season finale of Idol'''s Season 8 to perform "I'm Yours" with fellow Idol contestant Alexis Grace and singer Jason Mraz.

Performances and results

 Desai was initially eliminated, as he did not receive enough votes to advance immediately to the Top 12. However, on the March 4 results show, the American Idol judges selected him as one of the 8 Wild Card contenders.
 Desai was selected as one of the finalists. His selection marked the first time in the show's history that 13 finalists were chosen.
 When Ryan Seacrest announced the results in the particular night, Desai was in the bottom three, but declared safe second when Megan Joy was eliminated.
 When Ryan Seacrest announced the results in the particular night, Desai was in the bottom three, but declared safe second when Scott MacIntyre was eliminated.
 Desai was saved first from elimination.
 Due to the judges using their one save to save Matt Giraud, the Top 7 remained intact for another week, in which there was a double elimination.

Career
Post-Idol
Since appearing on American Idol, Desai has appeared on The Ellen DeGeneres Show, Live with Regis and Kelly, The Mo'Nique Show, Access Hollywood, Today, and local radio stations across the nation. He has also performed with Amos Lee in Atlanta, Georgia. Desai also performed on the American Idols LIVE! Tour 2009 with his fellow Top 10 contestants; the tour visited fifty cities in the United States and Canada from July 5 to September 15, 2009.

Music
Desai's first single, titled "My Name," was co-written by Brandon Rogers and Desai, and was released on March 23, 2010 and briefly reached the Top 10 on the iTunes Pop chart. His debut album, titled All Is Fair, was produced by Ian Schreier and was released on May 4, 2010.

Desai's second single, titled "All Is Fair (Crazy Love)," was co-written by David Mikush and Desai. Desai was selected by Clear Channel Music and iHeartRadio as an "artist to watch" for September 2010 with this single as the featured track. The music video for "All Is Fair (Crazy Love)" was released on February 3, 2011.

Since 2012, Desai has written and performed R&B leaning pop music under the name TOTEM. His own music, including the singles "Bubblegum" and "Aftertaste" combined with music he has written for other artists have been streamed tens of millions of times.

Acting
In 2019, Desai made his Off-Broadway debut at MCC Theater in the musical "The Wrong Man" written by Ross Golan, directed by Tommy Kail, and starring Josh Henry. Onscreen, Desai has guest starred on Billions, Little Voice, and Russian Doll, as well as the Djinn in season four of What We Do in the Shadows.''

Discography

Albums

Extended plays

Digital singles

Filmography

Awards and nominations

References

External links
Anoop Desai Official Website
In the Spotlight with Anoop Desai

1986 births
Living people
21st-century American singers
American Idol participants
American male singers of Indian descent
Singers from North Carolina
People from Chapel Hill, North Carolina
University of North Carolina at Chapel Hill alumni
People from Cary, North Carolina
21st-century American male singers